Indalsälven is one of Sweden's longest rivers with a total length of 430 kilometers. Among its tributaries are  Kallströmmen, Långan, Hårkan and Ammerån. A total of 26 hydropower plants are placed along its course, making it the third most power producing river of Sweden.

The Indalsälven drains the Storsjön and culminates in the Bothnian Sea.

See also
Döda fallet

References

Rivers of Jämtland County
Rivers of Västernorrland County
Drainage basins of the Baltic Sea